Shane Wiedt (born July 19, 1995) is an American soccer player who plays as a defender for Sacramento Republic in the USL Championship.

Career

College
Wiedt began playing college soccer at the University of Akron in 2014, which he redshirted, but completed three seasons with Akron before transferring to the University of Pittsburgh in 2018 for his final college season.

During college, Wiedt appeared in the National Premier Soccer League with Erie Commodores in 2017. Following college in 2019, Wiedt also played with NPSL side Virginia Beach City.

Professional
On August 9, 2019, Wiedt signed for USL Championship side Loudoun United. He made his professional debut on September 7, starting in a 5–1 loss to Hartford Athletic.

On April 29, 2021, it was announced Wiedt had signed with USL Championship side Pittsburgh Riverhounds on a 1-year deal.

Wiedt joined USL Championship side Sacramento Republic on a one-year deal on January 12, 2023.

References

External links

Akron bio
Pitt bio

1995 births
Living people
American soccer players
Association football defenders
Akron Zips men's soccer players
Loudoun United FC players
National Premier Soccer League players
Pittsburgh Panthers men's soccer players
Pittsburgh Riverhounds SC players
Sacramento Republic FC players
Soccer players from Akron, Ohio
USL Championship players